Lionel Maurice Van Praag, GM (17 December 1908 – 15 May 1987) was an Australian motorcycle speedway champion, who won the inaugural Speedway World Championship in London on 10 September 1936. Van Praag's victory saw him established as Australia's first ever motorsport World Champion.

1931 UK Southern League Champion
In his first full season in British speedway, Lionel was a member of the Wembley Lions team that won the last ever Southern League and the National Trophy in 1931.

1932 UK National League Champion
Lionel won the inaugural National League title in 1932 with the Wembley Lions

1936 World Speedway Final

Circumstances

Lionel won the run-off for the Speedway World Championship against Eric Langton in 1936 in somewhat controversial circumstances. The Championship was decided by bonus points accumulated in previous rounds. Despite being unbeaten in the final, Bluey Wilkinson was not crowned Champion. Bonus points accumulated by Van Praag and Langton took them to the top of the standings and into a run-off (match race).

The Match Race
As they lined up at the tapes, Langton broke them which would ordinarily lead to disqualification. However, Van Praag stated he did not want to win the title by default and insisted that a race should take place. At the restart Langton made it to the first bend in front and led until the final bend on the last lap when Van Praag darted through the smallest of gaps to win by less than wheel length.

Controversy
Afterwards, controversial allegations were abound that the two riders had 'fixed' the match race, deciding between them that the first person to the first bend would win the race and the Championship and split the prize money; Langton led into the first bend but was overtaken by Van Praag. Van Praag reportedly paid Langton £50 "conscience money" after the race for going back on the agreement.

Australia
Van Praag was also a successful rider in his home country, though he never won the Australian Championship, finishing second in 1941 (3 laps), 1946 (3 laps), and 1947 (2 & 3 laps), as well as finishing third in 1940 (3 laps). He won the NSW State Championship in 1941 at the Sydney Sports Ground and the Victorian Championship in 1947.

Van Praag also represented Australia in test matches at home against England on numerous occasions at tracks around the country including the Sydney Showground, Sydney Sports Ground, Wayville Showground (Adelaide), Claremont Speedway (Perth) and the Exhibition Speedway in Melbourne.

World Final appearances
 1936 –  London, Wembley Stadium – Winner – 14pts plus 12 bonus pts (won run-off)
 1937 –  London, Wembley Stadium – 7th – 6pts + 11 bonus pts
 1938 –  London, Wembley Stadium – 4th – 11pts + 7 bonus pts

World War II
Van Praag was awarded the George Medal for bravery during World War II, when a Royal Australian Air Force Douglas DC-2, in which he was second pilot was shot down, by two Japanese aircraft over the Sumba Strait in Indonesia. Van Praag, a sergeant at the time, and the aircraft captain, Flying Officer Noel Webster helped two colleagues—one semi-conscious and the other a non-swimmer—to shore after spending thirty hours in the water during which they had to fight off several shark attacks. After the war, Van Praag participated in one more speedway championship, but retired in 1950 to concentrate on his career as a pilot.

Van Praag also appeared in the 1933 British film Money for Speed which starred John Loder, Ida Lupino, Cyril McLaglen and Moore Marriott. Ginger Lees, Frank Varey and speedway promoter Johnnie Hoskins also featured.

Personal
Van Praag was Jewish.

In 1990, Van Praag was inducted into the Sport Australia Hall of Fame.

In 2008, he was inducted into the Australian Speedway Hall of Fame.

Legacy
In 2000, the Australian Capital Territory Place Names Committee  named a street, Van Praag Circuit (ten weeks later renamed Van Praag Place), after him.

Players cigarette cards
Van Praag is listed as number 45 of 50 in the 1930s Player's cigarette card collection.

References

External links
The Flying Dutchman – lionelvanpraag.com

1908 births
1987 deaths
Australian speedway riders
Individual Speedway World Champions
Australian World War II pilots
Royal Australian Air Force personnel of World War II
Recipients of the George Medal
Australian Jews
Wembley Lions riders
New Cross Rangers riders
Australian people of Dutch-Jewish descent
Jewish sportspeople
Sport Australia Hall of Fame inductees
Military personnel from New South Wales